Gary Saul Morson (born 1948) is an American literary critic and Slavist. He is particularly known for his scholarly work on the great Russian novelists Leo Tolstoy and Fyodor Dostoevsky, and the literary theorist Mikhail Bakhtin. Morson is Lawrence B. Dumas Professor of the Arts and Humanities at Northwestern University. Prior to this he was chair of the Department of Slavic Languages and Literatures at the University of Pennsylvania for many years.

Academic career 
Gary Saul Morson was born in New York City and attended the Bronx High School of Science. After the high school, Gary Morson was accepted to Yale University. Initially, Morson was interested in physics. However, he ended up graduating with a degree in Russian. 
"What I liked about physics is that it asked the ultimate questions. I loved how when you look at the world, all this amazing complexity had these very simple rules behind it. Now I believe the opposite — the argument of my favorite writer, Tolstoy, is that the world doesn't fit any system, because human psychology is so infinitely complex," Morson says. Morson spent a year at Oxford on a Henry Fellowship. At Oxford, he became friends with Bill Clinton. “A great deal of my pitiful income from those years went to Clinton’s campaign for attorney general of Arkansas,” Morson says. After studying at Oxford, Morson completed his Ph.D. degree at Yale University.

In 1974 he started teaching at the University of Pennsylvania where he later became chair of the Department of Slavic Languages and Literatures. Since 1986 he has been teaching at Northwestern University. His course Introduction to Russian Literature attracts around 500 students – the largest Slavic language class offered in America. Together with Morton Schapiro, President of Northwestern University, he teaches a course called “Economics and the Humanities: Understanding Choice in the Past, Present and Future.”

Morson is the editor of a scholarly book series titled Studies in Russian Literature and Theory (SRLT) published by Northwestern University Press, which is described as "reflecting trends within the field of Slavic studies over the years . . . providing perspectives on Russian literature from all periods and genres, as well as its place in the broader culture."

Personal life
Gary Saul Morson lives in Evanston, Illinois with his wife Jane. The couple has a daughter named Emily and a son named Alexander.

Selected works 
His critique of literalist translation methods appeared in Commentary in 2010.

 1981 – The Boundaries of Genre: Dostoevsky's Diary of a Writer and the Traditions of Literary Utopia (University of Texas Press) .
 1986 – Bakhtin, Essays and Dialogues on His Work (University of Chicago Press) .
 1986 – Literature and History: Theoretical Problems and Russian Case Studies (Stanford University Press) .
 1987 – Hidden in Plain View: Narrative and Creative Potentials in War and Peace (Stanford University Press) .
 1989 – Rethinking Bakhtin: Extensions and Challenges (Northwestern University Press) .
 1990 – Mikhail Bakhtin: Creation of a Prosaics (with Caryl Emerson, Stanford University Press) .
 1994 – Narrative and Freedom: The Shadows of Time (Yale University Press) .
 1995 – Freedom and Responsibility in Russian Literature: Essays in Honor of Robert Louis Jackson (Northwestern University Press) .
 2000 – And Quiet Flows the Vodka, or When Pushkin Comes to Shove (Northwestern University Press) .
 2007 – Anna Karenina in Our Time: Seeing More Wisely (Yale University Press) .
 2011 – The Words of Others: From Quotations to Culture (Yale University Press) .
 2012 – The Long and Short of It: From Aphorism to Novel (Stanford University Press) .
 2013 – Prosaics and Other Provocations: Empathy, Open Time, and the Novel (Academic Studies Press) .
 2015 – The Fabulous Future? America and the World in 2040 (with Morton Schapiro, Northwestern University Press) .
 2017 – Cents and Sensibility: What Economics Can Learn From the Humanities (with Morton Schapiro, Princeton University Press) .

Under the name Alicia Chudo 
 And Quiet Flows the Vodka, or When Pushkin Comes to Shove: The Curmudgeon's Guide to Russian Literature and Culture. Evanston, Ill.: Northwestern University Press, 2000. ,

See also 
 Russian literature
 Mikhail Bakhtin
 Heteroglossia
 Chronotope
 Menippean satire
 Polyphony (literature)

References

External links 
 Faculty webpage
 Articles at First Things

Living people
1948 births
American literary critics
Members of the American Academy of Arts and Letters
Northwestern University faculty
Yale University alumni
Slavists
Journalists from New York City